From 1896 to 1929, the United States Department of War gave their publications a successive number, like other departments including the Department of Agriculture and Department of the Treasury.  They were mostly (drill) regulations and other field manuals (as they were later called, when the War Department adopted the FM Field Manual numbering), but also collections of military laws or descriptions of countries of military interest and campaigns or battles. Only a few Technical Manuals (TM's) (as they were later called) are included in this series. These publications were mainly printed by the Government Printing Office, but also by some other printers. Many of them can be found in the HathiTrust, Archive.org and CARC (Combined Arms Research Center) online libraries. Other known US War department publications are for example General Orders, Special Orders and Special Regulations. Many of the so-called Monographs, mainly descriptions of campaigns and battles, have their own numbering, but several of them also have a War Department Document (W.D. doc) number.

List

See also
 United States War Department Forms

References

1) Rough list of the more important additions to the War department library, 1898: Complete list of the War Departments Documents through no.60 (through 1897)
2) List of War Department documents, 1920: Incomplete list of the documents in use in 1920
3) See the lists in several Monographs
4) See list in Combined Arms Research Center
5) See the list in W.D. doc. no.1092 and other radio communications pamphlets
6) See list in W.D.D. No. 850 Training Circular no.7

United States Department of War publications
United States Army publications
United States Army lists
World War I artillery of the United States